The Battle of Zlatitsa was fought on 12 December 1443 between the Ottoman Empire and Serbian and Hungarian troops in the Balkans. The battle was fought at Zlatitsa Pass near the town of Zlatitsa in the Balkan Mountains, Ottoman Empire (modern-day Bulgaria). The impatience of the king of Poland and the severity of the winter then compelled Hunyadi (February 1444) to return home, but not before he had utterly broken the Sultan's power in Bosnia, Herzegovina, Serbia, Bulgaria, and Albania.

Background
In 1440 John Hunyadi became the trusted adviser and most highly regarded soldier of the king Władysław III of Poland. Hunyadi was rewarded with the captaincy of the fortress of Belgrade and was put in charge of military operations against the Ottomans. The king Władysław recognized Hunyadi's merits by granting him estates in Eastern Hungary. Hunyadi soon showed and displayed extraordinary capacity in marshalling its defenses with the limited resources at his disposal. He was victorious in Semendria over Isak-Beg in 1441, not far from Nagyszeben in Transylvania he annihilated an Ottoman force and recovered for Hungary the suzerainty of Wallachia. In July 1442 at the Iron Gates he defeated a massed Ottoman formation of 80.000 led by Sehabbedin. These victories made Hunyadi a prominent enemy of the Ottomans and renowned throughout Christendom, and were prime motivators for him to undertake in 1443, along with King Władysław, the famous expedition known as the long campaign with the Battle of Niš as one of the battles of this campaign. Hunyadi was accompanied by Giuliano Cesarini during this campaign. The battle took place in the plain between Bolvani and Niš on November 3, 1443. Ottoman forces were led by Kasim Pasha, the beglerbeg of Rumelia, Turakhan Beg and Isak-Beg. After the Ottoman defeat, the retreating forces of Kasim Pasha and Turakhan Beg burned all of the villages between Niš and Sofia. The Ottoman sources justify an Ottoman defeat by lack of cooperation between the Ottoman armies led by different commanders.

Battle 
Until the Battle of Zlatica, crusaders had not meet a major Ottoman army, only town garrisons along their route toward Adrianople. Only at Zlatica they met strong and well-positioned defence forces of the Ottoman army. The severe winter cold weather favored the position of the Ottoman defenders. The Ottoman forces were commanded by Kasim Pasha. The crusaders intended to continue their advance toward Adrianople through the forests of Sredna Gora. When they reached Zlatica, they were unable to continue their advance because the pass was blocked by the very strong Ottoman army, the weather was bitterly cold, it was very hard for them to obtain regular supplies of their forces and Ottoman forces of Kasim Pasha repeatedly attacked them.

Aftermath 
After the Battle of Zlatica and subsequent retreat of the crusaders, the battlefield and surrounding region were completely destroyed. Serbia was devastated while Sofia was destroyed and burnt, turned into "black field" with its surrounding villages being turned into "black charcoal". Only Đurađ Branković gained from 1443 campaign.

As they marched home, however, the crusaders ambushed and defeated a pursuing Turkish force in the Battle of Kunovica, where Mahmud Bey, son-in-law of the Sultan and brother of the Grand Vizier Çandarlı Halil Pasha, was taken prisoner.

Historical sources 
There is debate amongst historians as to the victor of the battle. According to Halil Inalcik "İzladi ve Varna Savaşları (1443–1444) Üzerinde Gazavatnâme" of unknown author is most reliable of all Ottoman chronicles about the events related to Battle of Zlatica and Battle of Varna.

References

Battles involving the Ottoman Empire
Zlatitsa
Battles involving Hungary in the Middle Ages
Battles of the Ottoman–Serbian Wars
Conflicts in 1443
Battles involving Serbia in the Middle Ages
1443 in Europe
1443 in the Ottoman Empire
Serbian Despotate
15th century in Serbia